The first USS Henley (DD-39) was a modified  in the United States Navy during World War I and later in the United States Coast Guard, designated as CG-12. She was named for Robert Henley.

Henley was launched on 3 April 1912 by the Fore River Shipbuilding Company, in Quincy, Massachusetts; sponsored by Miss Constance Henley Kane, great-grandniece or Robert Henley; and commissioned at Boston, Massachusetts, on 6 December 1912.

Pre-World War I
After training and shakedown, Henley joined the US Atlantic Torpedo Fleet at Newport, Rhode Island, for a peacetime career of tactical exercises and training maneuvers along the coast from the Caribbean to the North Atlantic. On 22 April 1914, she joined the fleet off Tampico, Mexico, to protect American citizens and property in the face of revolution in that country. During this period, Henley also saw duty transporting refugees and supplies.  With war in Europe that fall, she began Neutrality Patrol along the coast and checked belligerent vessels in American ports.

World War I
When America entered World War I in April 1917, Henley continued patrol along the coast and also escorted fuel ships to the destroyers guarding America's first troop convoy on 13 June. For the remainder of the war, Henley performed convoy duty along the coast and carried out anti-submarine patrol off New York harbor. Henley put in at the Philadelphia Navy Yard on 22 December 1918 and decommissioned there on 12 December 1919.

Inter-war period
Transferred to the Coast Guard on 16 May 1924, she served in the Rum Patrol. She was originally stationed at Stapleton, New York and then transferred to New London, Connecticut.

She returned to the Navy on 8 May 1931 and was sold for scrap to Michael Flynn Inc. of Brooklyn, New York on 22 August 1934.

References

External links

 

Paulding-class destroyers
Monaghan-class destroyers
World War I destroyers of the United States
Ships built in Quincy, Massachusetts
1912 ships